The 2009–10 season is FC Metalist Kharkiv's 65th season in existence and the club's 6th consecutive season in the top flight of Ukrainian football. In addition to the domestic league, Metalist Kharkiv participated in that season's editions of the Ukrainian Cup and the UEFA Europa League. The season covers the period from 1 July 2009 to 30 June 2010.

Players

First team squad
Squad at end of season

Left club during season

Competitions

Overall record

Ukrainian Premier League

League table

Results summary

Results by round

Results

References

FC Metalist Kharkiv
FC Metalist Kharkiv seasons